Hua Gang (1903–1972) was the president of Shandong University in Qingdao from February 1951 until August 1955.

1903 births
1972 deaths
Presidents of Shandong University
Chinese political philosophers
Republic of China historians
People's Republic of China historians
Writers from Quzhou
Educators from Quzhou
Victims of the Cultural Revolution
People's Republic of China politicians from Zhejiang
Republic of China translators
People's Republic of China translators
20th-century Chinese philosophers
Politicians from Quzhou
20th-century Chinese translators
20th-century Chinese historians
Historians from Zhejiang